Žabalj is a town and municipality located in the South Bačka District of the autonomous province of Vojvodina, Serbia. The town Žabalj has a population of 9,107 and the municipality Žabalj has a population of 25,777. It is located in southeastern part of Bačka, known as Šajkaška. All settlements in the municipality have an ethnic Serb majority.

Name
Its name came from the Serbian word "žaba"/жаба ("frog" in English). In Serbian, the town is known as Žabalj (Жабаљ), in Hungarian as Zsablya or Józseffalva (between 1886 and 1919), in German as Josefdorf, and in Croatian as Žabalj.

History

Žabalj was first mentioned in 1514 as Zeble, a fortress captured by György Dózsa. During the Ottoman rule (16th-17th century), it was populated by ethnic Serbs.

In the 18th and 19th centuries, Žabalj was part of the Habsburg Military Frontier (Šajkaš Battalion). The first church in Žabalj was mentioned in 1720, but it was later razed. After 1763, the village was part of Šajkaš Battalion until the military administration was abolished in 1783. Present-day Orthodox churches dedicated to Saint Nicholas were built in 1835. In 1901, a Catholic church was built as well.

It belonged to Hungary 1920, when by the Treaty of Trianon it became part of the Kingdom of Serbs, Croats and Slovenes and subsequent South Slavic states.

After the 1941 annexation of the town by Hungary, in a 1942 raid, 666 inhabitants of the town were murdered: 355 men, 141 women, 101 children, and 69 elderly people. Those who were liable, were convicted by Hungary in 1943.

During the Communist purges in Serbia in 1944–45, about 1500, mostly civilian Hungarians and Germans were murdered. None of the perpetrators were convicted, and during the Communist regime, the topic of the genocide was suppressed in both Hungary and Yugoslavia.

Inhabited places
Žabalj municipality encompasses the town of Žabalj, and the following villages:
Gospođinci
Đurđevo
Čurug

Demographics

Historical population of the town
1961: 7,457
1971: 7,851
1981: 8,503
1991: 8,766

Ethnic groups
The population of the Žabalj municipality:
 Serbs (86.25%)
 Rusins (5.11%)
 Romani (2.79%)
 Hungarians (1.1%)

Economy
The following table gives a preview of total number of employed people per their core activity (as of 2017):

Gallery

See also
 Šajkaška
 South Bačka District
 List of places in Serbia
 List of cities, towns and villages in Vojvodina

References

Slobodan Ćurčić, Broj stanovnika Vojvodine, Novi Sad, 1996.
Zvonimir Golubović, Racija u južnoj Bačkoj 1942. godine, Novi Sad, 1991.
Dr Dušan J. Popović, Srbi u Vojvodini, knjiga 1, Novi Sad, 1990.

References

External links

 Official presentation of Zabalj municipality

 
Places in Bačka
Populated places in South Bačka District
Municipalities and cities of Vojvodina
Towns in Serbia